The PMR-U is a Yugoslavian anti-personnel stake mine. The mine was apparently not mass-produced, but built in small numbers at a number of different locations.

The mine has a small plastic main body with a large seam in the middle. Internally the mine has a  main charge around which a mixture of Plaster of Paris and steel fragments is poured to form a fragmentation liner. The mine uses a number of different commercial explosives, with the result that the mine becomes unstable over time. 

The mine is found in Bosnia and Croatia.

Specifications
 Height:  (without fuse and stake)
 Diameter: 
 Explosive content:  of commercial explosives
 Operating pressure:  pull
 Fuze: UPM-1 or UPMR-2A

References
 Jane's Mines and Mine Clearance 2005-2006

Anti-personnel mines
Land mines of Yugoslavia